Black River is a common name for streams and communities around the world: in Spanish and Portuguese, Rio Negro; in French, Rivière Noire; in Turkish, Kara Su; in Serbo-Croatian, Crna Reka, Црна Река or Crna Rijeka, Црна Ријека; in Macedonian, Црна Река, Crna Reka.

Streams

Africa 

 Bafing River, also known as Black River
 Black River (Cape Town)
 Niger River, named by European mapmakers during the Middle Ages, perhaps from Latin niger "black"

Australia

 Black River (Queensland)
 Black River (Tasmania)
 Black River (Victoria)

Brazil and Colombia 

 Black River (Amazon), known as Rio Negro in Portuguese and Río Negro or Río Guainía in Spanish

Canada 

 Black River (Newfoundland and Labrador)
 Black River (New Brunswick)
 Black River (Ontario), listing eight rivers of the name
 Black River (Portneuf), Quebec
 Black River (Vancouver Island)
 Noire River (Ottawa River tributary), Quebec, English translation Black River

China 
Mainland
 Amur River
 Black River (Asia), also known as Lixian River, a tributary of the Red River
 Ejin River, also known as the Heihe (黑河, lit. "black river")

Taiwan is listed separately.

Honduras

 Sico River, historically called the Rio Tinto, or Black River

India 

 Krishna River, from Sanskrit Krishna "Black"

Ireland 

 Black River (Ireland)
 Duff River, the northern part is also known as the Black River

Jamaica 

 Black River (Jamaica)

Macedonia 

 Crna River (Vardar)

Russia 

 Amur River
 Chernaya River (Saint Petersburg), also known as the Tchernaya Rechka
 Chernaya River (subway station), a subway station in Saint Petersburg

Sri Lanka

 Black River (Sri Lanka)

Taiwan
 Black River (Taiwan), another name for the Dadu River

Ukraine 

 Chyornaya (Crimea), also known as the Black River

United States 

 Draanjik River, also known as Black River, a tributary of the Porcupine River in Alaska
 Black River (Arizona), a tributary of the Salt River
 Black River (Arkansas–Missouri), a tributary of the White River
 Black River, the name of the lower reaches of the Ouachita River in Arkansas
 Black River (Okefenokee Swamp), Georgia
 Black River (Indiana), a small tributary of the Wabash River
 Black River (Louisiana)
 In Michigan
 Black River, Michigan, an unincorporated community
 Black River (Alcona County), tributary of Lake Huron
 Black River (Cheboygan County), tributary of the Cheboygan River
 Black River (Gogebic County), tributary of Lake Superior
 Black River (Mackinac County), tributary of Lake Michigan
 Black River, tributary of Lake Michigan, also called Macatawa River
 Black River (Marquette County), tributary of the Escanaba River
 Black River (Southwest Michigan), tributary of Lake Michigan
 Black River (St. Clair River tributary), tributary of the St. Clair River
 In Minnesota
Black River (Rainy River)
Black River (Red Lake River)
 Black River (New Jersey), a tributary of the North Branch Raritan River
 Black River (New Mexico), a tributary of the Pecos River
 In New York
 Black River (New York), a tributary of Lake Ontario
 Black River (Kinderhook Creek tributary), in Rensselaer County
 Black River (Bouquet River tributary), in Essex County
 Black River (North Carolina), a tributary of the Cape Fear River
 Black River (Ohio), a tributary of Lake Erie
 Black River (Saucon Creek), in Pennsylvania
 Black River (South Carolina), a tributary of the Great Pee Dee River
 In Vermont:
 Black River (Connecticut River tributary), a tributary of the Connecticut River in southern Vermont
 Black River (Lake Memphremagog), a tributary of Lake Memphremagog in northern Vermont
 In Washington
 Black River (Chehalis River tributary), a tributary of the Chehalis River in the state of Washington
 Black River (Duwamish River tributary), a river in the state of Washington
 In Wisconsin
 Black River (Wisconsin-Lake Michigan), a tributary of Lake Michigan in the state of Wisconsin
 Black River (Wisconsin), a tributary of Mississippi River in the state of Wisconsin
 Black River (Nemadji River), a tributary of the Nemadji River in the state of Wisconsin

Vietnam 

 Black River (Asia), also known as Lixian River in China, a tributary of the Red River

Communities 

 Black River, Jamaica, the capital of St. Elizabeth Parish
 Black River (settlement), an 18th-century British settlement on the Caribbean coast of present-day Honduras

Mauritius

 Rivière Noire District, a district in Mauritius which mean 'Black River' in French

Australia
 Black River, Tasmania, a locality in North-west Tasmania

Canada

 New Brunswick
 Black River, New Brunswick (disambiguation), several places
 Black River Bridge, New Brunswick
 Black River, Newfoundland and Labrador
 Black River, Nova Scotia (disambiguation), listing three communities of that name
 Ontario
 Black River, Ontario, a community in Stormont, Dundas and Glengarry United Counties
 Black River-Matheson, a municipality and township in Cochrane District

United States 

 Black River, Michigan, an unincorporated community in Alcona Township
 Black River, New York, a village in Jefferson County
 Black River, Wisconsin, an unincorporated community in Douglas County
 Black River Falls, Wisconsin, a city in Jackson County
 Black River Township, Pennington County, Minnesota

Films 

 Black River (1957 film), a Japanese film by Masaki Kobayashi
 Black River (1993 film), an Australian film by Kevin Lucas
 Black River (2001 film), a US adventure film

Music 

 Black River (band), a Polish stoner rock/heavy metal band
 Black River (album), the debut album of the band
 Black River Entertainment, an American country-music record label
 Black Rivers, an English rock band
 Black River, a 2008 song by Bomb the Bass featuring Mark Lanegan
 "The Black River", a song by the Sword from the album Gods of the Earth

Others 

 Black River (stage), the name of a stage in North American stratigraphy
 Black River Public School (Holland, Michigan), a charter school

See also 
 Big Black River (disambiguation)
 Black Brook (disambiguation)
 Black Creek (disambiguation)
 
 Black River High School (disambiguation)
 Black River Township (disambiguation)
 Blackwater river
 Little Black River (disambiguation)
 Rio Negro (disambiguation)
 Kara Su (disambiguation)
 Crna Reka (disambiguation)
 Crna Rijeka (disambiguation)
 Heihe